The Burlington, Cedar Rapids & Northern Passenger Station-Vinton, also known as Rock Island Depot and the Vinton Depot, is a historic building located in Vinton, Iowa, United States.  Completed in 1900, this depot replaced a previous depot of the Burlington, Cedar Rapids and Northern Railway (BCR&N) located on the east side of town.  It was designed by the railroad's architect and chief engineer, H.F. White, and built by A.H. Connor & Company of Cedar Rapids.  The single-story brick structure was constructed on a limestone foundation.  Three years after it was built, the BCR&N was acquired by the Chicago, Rock Island and Pacific Railroad.  It continued to serve as a working depot until 1967.  The Benton County Historical Society restored the depot and converted into a railroad museum.  The building was listed on the National Register of Historic Places in 1990.

References

Railway stations in the United States opened in 1900
Railway stations closed in 1967
Former railway stations in Iowa
Vinton, Iowa
Railroad museums in Iowa
Museums in Benton County, Iowa
National Register of Historic Places in Benton County, Iowa
Railway stations on the National Register of Historic Places in Iowa
Vinton
Transportation buildings and structures in Benton County, Iowa